Zhang Fujia (born 15 August 1982 in Henan, China) is a Chinese baseball infielder for the Sichuan Dragons. He was a member of the China national baseball team competing in the 2009 World Baseball Classic.

References

1982 births
Living people
Chinese baseball players
2009 World Baseball Classic players
Sportspeople from Henan